Thangjing Hill is a mountain range in the Indian state of Manipur, India. The hill range is the abode of God Eputhou Thangjing and other Meitei deities in Meitei mythology. The temple of Lord Eputhou Thangjing at the Hill top is a major pilgrimage site for followers of Sanamahi faith in Manipur.

The Indian Airlines Flight 257 crashed into the hill range on 16 August 1991, killing all 69 people on board.

Mythology

In Meitei mythology, the hill is mainly associated with the deity Lord Eputhou Thangjing who is the Guardian of the mountain and the protector of the South of the Kanglei world. The hill is also mentioned in the great Meitei epic poetry of Khamba Thoibi.

See also
 Mount Koubru
 Baruni Hill

References

Mountains of India